Maria Rodriguez may refer to:

 Ana María Rodríguez (alpine skier) (born 1962), Spanish former alpine skier
 Ana María Rodríguez (writer) (born 1958), American children's author
 Maria Rodriguez (Algerian swimmer) in Swimming at the 2007 World Aquatics Championships – Women's 200 metre butterfly
 Maria Rodriguez (bowler), see Colombia at the 2019 Pan American Games
 Maria Rodriguez (Venezuelan swimmer) (born 1978), competed in Swimming at the 2007 World Aquatics Championships – Women's 100 metre butterfly
 María Rodríguez (volleyball), (born 1946), Mexican volleyball player
 María Ángeles Rodríguez (born 1957), Spanish field hockey player and 1992 Olympic gold medalist
 María Cecilia Rodríguez (born 1967), Argentine politician
 María Ignacia Rodríguez de Velasco y Osorio Barba (1778–1851), Mexico City socialite
 Maria Rodriguez-Gregg (born 1981), member of the New Jersey General Assembly
 Mala Rodríguez (born 1979), Spanish hip-hop singer

Characters
 María Rodríguez, a character in the Sesame Street series
 Maria Rodriguez, a character in the Archie Comics series
 Maria Figueroa Rodriguez, a character on the U.S. children's television show Sesame Street

See also 
 Maria Isabel Rodriguez (disambiguation)
 Ana María Rodríguez (disambiguation)